The 1986–87 South Midlands League season was 58th in the history of South Midlands League.

Premier Division

The Premier Division featured 15 clubs which competed in the division last season, along with 1 new club, promoted from last season's Division One: 
Totternhoe

League table

Division One

The Division One featured 11 clubs which competed in the division last season, along with 3 new clubs:
GS Ashcroft Co-op, relegated from Premier Division
Caddington
Milford Villa

League table

References

1986-87
8